Kouloudia is a sub-prefecture of Lac Region in Chad.

References 

Populated places in Chad